Crumenulopsis sororia is an ascomycete or cup fungus which can cause cankers on the bark of various species of Pinus, including Pinus contorta, Pinus nigra, Pinus sylvestris and Pinus cembra.

References

Further reading
 Lexikon der Baum und straucharten. Schutt/Schuck/Stimm 1991.

Helotiaceae